USLHT Camellia was a lighthouse tender in commission in the fleet of the United States Lighthouse Service from 1911 to 1917 and from 1919 to 1939, and – as USCGC Camellia (WAGL-206) – in the fleet of the United States Coast Guard from 1939 to 1947. During World War I she briefly saw war service with the United States Army in 1917 before serving as the United States Navy patrol vessel USS Camellia from 1917 to 1919. She also saw service in World War II under U.S. Navy control while in the Coast Guard fleet. After the conclusion of her United States Government career, she operated for decades in the service of the Dominican Navy as Capotillo (FB 101).

Construction and commissioning

Camellia was constructed in 1911 by the Racine Boat Manufacturing Company in Muskegon, Michigan, for the United States Lighthouse Service. She was commissioned into service in the Lighthouse Service's fleet as USLHT Camellia on 13 July 1911.

Service history

1911–1917
Early in her career, Camellia operated in the Eighth Lighthouse District along the United States Gulf Coast. Her home port was at New Orleans, Louisiana.

World War I
The United States entered World War I on 6 April 1917, and by executive order Camellia was among a number of lighthouse tenders the Lighthouse Service transferred to the United States Department of War on 11 April 1917 for United States Army service on coastal defense duties. Among other things, the lighthouse tenders deployed submarine nets to defend harbors and those outfitted with mine-planting gear – as Camellia had been even before the declaration of war – also placed controlled minefields to protect harbors from penetration by enemy vessels.

On 1 July 1917, the U.S. Department of War transferred Camellia to the United States Department of the Navy for United States Navy wartime service. Commissioned into Navy service as USS Camellia, she operated as a patrol vessel in the Eighth Naval District along the U.S. Gulf Coast through the end of the war on 11 November 1918 and during its immediate aftermath. The Navy transferred her back to the Lighthouse Service on 1 July 1919.

1919–1941

As USLHT Camellia, the ship returned to lighthouse tender duty. In 1933, her original steam engines were replaced by Atlas-Imperial diesel engines.

On 1 July 1939, the U.S. Lighthouse Service was abolished and the United States Coast Guard took over its responsibilities and assets, and Camellia thus became part of the Coast Guard fleet as USCGC Camellia.

World War II
On 1 November 1941, with World War II raging in Europe, North Africa, and the Middle East, the U.S. Coast Guard was transferred to the control of the U.S. Navy under Executive Order 8929, and Camellia thus again came under U.S. Navy control only weeks before the United States entered the war on 7 December 1941. She was assigned the hull classification symbol WAGL-206 in 1942.

Post-World War II
Returned to U.S. Coast Guard control after the conclusion of World War II, Camellia was decommissioned on 29 December 1947.

Dominican Republic
The United States Government transferred the ship to the Dominican Republic in 1949. In Dominican Navy service, she was renamed Capotillo (FB 101) and reclassified as "Service Craft No. 1." She was still in service in the 1980s, but her subsequent fate is unknown.

References

Footnotes

Bibliography
 
 
 Henry, Ellen, Dr., "Lighthouses In World War I: Transition Into War," American Lighthouse, Winter 2014

Ships of the United States Lighthouse Service
Ships of the United States Coast Guard
Lighthouse tenders of the United States
World War I patrol vessels of the United States
World War II auxiliary ships of the United States
1911 ships
Ships built in Muskegon, Michigan
Ships of the Dominican Navy